Sofia Iosifidou (Σοφία Ιωσηφίδου, born 13 January 1981) was a Greek female water polo player. She was a member of the Greece women's national water polo team, playing as a centre back Water Polo.

Career
She was a part of the  team at the 2008 Summer Olympics. On club level she played for Ethnikos Piraeus and  ANO glyfada in Greece and is one of the four who has winning Three European champions league and eight national champions.

Family
Her father is water polo player Kyriakos Iosifidis, who was part of the Greece men's national water polo team at the 1968 and 1972 Summer Olympics. She is married with two children

References

External links
Sofia Iosifidou at Sports Reference
http://www.zimbio.com/photos/Brenda+Villa/Sofia+Iosifidou
http://www.gettyimages.com/photos/sofia-iosifidou?excludenudity=true&sort=mostpopular&mediatype=photography&phrase=sofia%20iosifidou
http://www.alamy.com/stock-photo-greeces-sofia-iosifidou-r-reaches-for-the-ball-over-a-player-from-119748845.html

1981 births
Living people
Greek female water polo players
Water polo players at the 2008 Summer Olympics
Olympic water polo players of Greece
Place of birth missing (living people)

Ethnikos Piraeus Water Polo Club players
21st-century Greek women